Rachel Aviv is an American writer and author. She is currently staff writer for The New Yorker. 

Aviv won a 2020 Whiting Award in creative non-fiction and a 2010 Rona Jaffe Foundation Writers' Award. She has investigated Teen Challenge, guardianship abuse, and  family courts.

Aviv graduated from Brown University in 2004.

Her book Strangers to Ourselves was selected for The New York Timess "10 Best Books of 2022" list. The book  was a finalist for the 2023 National Book Critics Circle award in criticism.

References 

American women writers
Living people
Year of birth missing (living people)
Brown University alumni